The FIS Alpine World Ski Championships 1985 were held in Bormio, northern Italy between January 31 and February 10, 1985.

These were the first world championships held in an odd-numbered year, and the last without the Super-G event.

The World Championships returned to Bormio two decades later in 2005.

Men's Competitions

Downhill
Sunday, February 3

Giant Slalom
Thursday, February 7
<div style="float:left;text-align:left;padding-right:15px">

Slalom
Sunday, February 10

Combined
Tuesday, February 5 (slalom, 2 runs)
Friday, February 1 (downhill)

Women's competitions

Downhill
Sunday, February 3(delayed one day; high winds)

Giant Slalom
Wednesday, February 6

Slalom
Saturday, February 9

Combined
Monday, February 4 (slalom, 2 runs)
Thursday, January 31 (downhill)

Medals table
References

External links
FIS-Ski.com - results - 1985 World Championships - Bormio, Italy

FIS Alpine World Ski Championships
1985
A
1985 in Italian sport
Alpine skiing competitions in Italy
January 1985 sports events in Europe
February 1985 sports events in Europe